Alvaro Magelanes was a Roman Catholic prelate who served as Bishop of San Leone (1565–1571).

Biography
On 15 May 1565, Alvaro Magelanes was appointed during the papacy of Pope Pius IV as Bishop of San Leone. He served as Bishop of San Leone until his death on 27 Nov 1571.

References 

16th-century Italian Roman Catholic bishops
Bishops appointed by Pope Pius IV
1571 deaths